Twenty-One is a 1923 American silent drama film directed by John S. Robertson and starring Richard Barthelmess, Dorothy Mackaill, and Joe King.

Cast

References

Bibliography
 Monaco, James. The Encyclopedia of Film. Perigee Books, 1991.

External links

Still at www.granger.com

1923 films
1923 drama films
Silent American drama films
Films directed by John S. Robertson
American silent feature films
1920s English-language films
American black-and-white films
First National Pictures films
1920s American films